Arachovitika is a village and a community in the municipal unit of Rio in the northern part of Achaea, Greece. It is situated on the Gulf of Corinth, 1 km northwest of Drepano and 6 km northeast of Rio. The Greek National Road 8A (Patras - Corinth) passes south of the village, and the railway Patras - Corinth runs through the village. The community consists of the villages Arachovitika and Kato Arachovitika. There is a port next to Cape Drepano.

Historical population

See also
List of settlements in Achaea

References

Populated places in Achaea
Rio, Greece